The Vibe for Philo was a one-day festival/concert that was held yearly as a tribute to Thin Lizzy frontman Phil Lynott, on 4 January, the anniversary of his death. It was first organised in 1987 by Lynott's friend Smiley Bolger who ran it to its announced conclusion in 2023. Each year a variety of musicians performed, including Thin Lizzy tribute bands as well as members of bands Phil played in and reformed versions of these bands, such as when a re-formed version of Thin Lizzy performed in 1996. Each year the festival had a title, usually drawn from that of a Thin Lizzy song. The showcase has produced some memorable performances including then unknowns such as Damien Dempsey, Paddy Casey, Leanne Hart and Conor McGouran (Xerath/The Enigma Division). Highlights are uploaded to YouTube. 

The final festival, the 36th, was called "This Is the One".

Vibe for Philo by year

2008 - "Johnny the Fox Meets Jimmy the Weed"
Venue: The Button Factory
Artists/Speakers: Hoodoo Rhythm Devils, Gnasher, The Southbound Band, Tizz Lizzy, Glyder

2009 - "Dancing in the Moonlight"
Venue: The Button Factory
Artists/Speakers: Hoodoo Rhythm Devils, The Lizzyboys, Matt & Phil (of Tizz Lizzy), John Conlon (of Thin az Lizzy), Derek Herebert, Dave McGuinness, Colm Querney, Mark Adams, Paul Toal, Robbie Bray, Richie Buckley, Emerald, Renegade, Nell Bryden

2010 - "Running Back"
Venue: The Button Factory
Artists/Speakers: Hoodoo Rhythm Devils, Yellow Pearl, Metalita, Tupelo, Barry Whyte Band, Silverbird, Keith Grogan & John Nesbitt, The Quicksand Band, Dave Morrissey

2011 - "Black Rose"
Venue: Vicar Street
Artists/Speakers: Eric Bell, Brian Robertson Band, Chris Laney, Hoodoo Rhythm Devils, Matt'n'Phil, The Pat McManus Band, Conor McGouran Quartet, Gnasher, Mark Dignam, Leanne Harte, Tony Powell, Glen Hansard

2012 - "Are You Ready?"
Venue: The Button Factory
Artists/Speakers: Doish Nagle's Grand Slam, The Thin Lizzy Experience, Republic of Loose, The Low Riders, Smiles Bolger

2013 - "Dublin"
Venue: The Button Factory
Artists/Speakers: Faither Jack, The Low Riders, Conor McGouran and The Harley's, The Thin Lizzy Experience, Dubh Linn Boys

2014 - "Fight or Fall"
Venue: Vicar Street
Artists/Speakers: Smiles Bolger, Brenny Bonass & Shea Fitzgerald, The Lizzy Experience, Sal Vitro, Pat Coldrick & Dick Farrelly, The Low Riders, Philomena Lynott, Dizzy Lizzy

2015 - "Get Out Of Here"
Venue: Vicar Street
Artists/Speakers: Pat McManus, The Low Riders, Bad Reputation, The Dark Lanes, Conor Scott, The Barley Mob, The Dunford Brothers

2016 - "The Sun Goes Down"
Venue: Vicar Street
Artists/Speakers: Eric Bell Trio, Brian Downey, The Soul Brothers, The Low Riders, Parris, The Hoodoos feat. John Conton, Mongoose, Fiach Moriarty

2017 - "Saga of the Ageing Orphan"

2018 - "Here I Go Again"

2019 - "With Love"

2023 – "This Is the One"

References

External links
Official website

Music festivals established in 1987
Rock festivals in Ireland 
Jam band festivals